Jacqueline Patricia Watkins (born 3 June 1949) was elected to the Parliament of Western Australia on 19 February 1983 as the Labor Party Member for Joondalup. Watkins served as the Member for Joondalup until 4 February 1989. From 4 February 1989 to 6 February 1993 she served as the Member for Wanneroo until the election of the Court Liberal Government.

Watkins married WA Labor Senator Jim McKiernan and later was known as Jackie McKiernan.

References

Members of the Western Australian Legislative Assembly
1949 births
Living people
Australian Labor Party members of the Parliament of Western Australia
Women members of the Western Australian Legislative Assembly
English emigrants to Australia